Huzziya II was a king of the Hittites. He was killed by Muwatalli I, who seized the throne and was possibly the Gal Mesedi of the royal bodyguard.

His wife was Queen Šummiri.

External links
Reign of Huzziya II at Hittites.info

Notes 

Hittite kings
15th-century BC rulers